Antonio Spadaccino,  (born 9 March 1983 in Foggia, Italy), better known as Antonino, is an Italian singer. In 2005, he won the fourth edition of the Italian talent show Amici di Maria De Filippi. His debut album Antonino sold over 30.000 copies and his first single Ce la farò reached the third position in Italy and was certified gold. In 2011 he won the Amici's competition Io Ci Sono and he gets a record deal with Mara Maionchi's label Non Ho L'età With Non Ho L'età records he released two albums: Costellazioni in 2011 and Libera quest'anima in 2012.

Discography

 Albums 
2006 – Antonino2008 – Nero indelebile2012 – Libera quest'anima EP 
2011 – Costellazioni Singles 
2005 – Ce la farò2006 – Un ultimo brivido2006 – Nel mio segreto profondo2007 – Resta come sei2007 – Nero indelebile2007 – Freedom2011 – Amore surreale2011 – Costellazioni2011 – Chi sono2012 – Ritornerà2012 - Resta ancora un po'''

References

External links

Italian pop singers
Singing talent show winners
Living people
1983 births
People from Foggia
21st-century Italian  male singers
Italian LGBT singers
21st-century Italian LGBT people